The Sinanishko Lake is a lake in Pirin, southwestern Bulgaria, situated below the Sinanitsa Peak in the small Sinanitsa cirque at an altitude of 2,181 metres. With depth of 11.5 metres it is among the 10 deepest lakes in the mountain range. It has an elongated shape (175 x 80 m) and an area of 10,100 square metres. Its waters pour out under the ground but they appear on the surface 120 metres away from the lake and form the beginning of the Sinanishka River which is a left tributary of the Vlachina river.

Lakes of the Pirin

References